Uisge Ban Falls (official spelling "Easach Ban" alternative spellings "Uisage"; "Bàn" or "Bahn") is a waterfall near Baddeck, Nova Scotia, Canada. The falls is located in Uisge Ban Falls Provincial Park near New Glen, Victoria County, 14.5 kilometres (9 miles) north of Baddeck.

Description

Easach Ban is a section of the longer Falls Brook, which flows into the North Branch Baddeck River, and eventually to St. Patricks Channel of the Bras d'Or Lake.

While most of Easach Ban is a cascade, there is a prominent section that is a horsetail waterfall dropping  in multiple steps, with a pool 2/3 of the way down, between sections of the falls.

Natural history
The landscape surrounding Easach Ban is a product or incredibly powerful forces which have shaped and reshaped the area over 5 billion years.  Formation of the earth's landmass, tremendous volcanic activity, collision of continents, mountain-building, massive erosion and glaciation, have all played a role in shaping this landscape.

Easach Ban lies in a steep-sided river canyon, part of the landscape which forms the interface between the elevated Cape Breton Boreal Plateau and the lower Central Cape Breton Hills landscapes. Rock types of this landscape are similar to those found in the boreal plateau - derived ancient granite, gneiss, and schist.

The Easach Ban canyon is filled by deciduous, coniferous, and mixed forests. Dominant tree species include sugar maple, yellow birch, beech, white spruce, and balsam fir. Provincially rare and uncommon plants occur in this canyon.

Name

The name Uisge Ban comes from the Gaelic meaning “white water”, uisge bàn, probably conflated with the word eas meaning a waterfall.

The official name usage for the falls is confusing as most maps produced by the Government of the Province of Nova Scotia and by many tourist groups use either of the two spellings starting with a "U", sometimes using both spellings in the same document, yet the only official name that appears in either Government of Nova Scotia or Government of Canada, Canadian Geographical Names Data Base (CGNDB) is the "Easach Ban" spelling. The "Easach Ban" spelling is the only version used on Government of Canada topographical maps.

The Falls Trail
The waterfall is accessible by trail.  The Falls Trail is approximately 3.0 kilometres (1.8 miles) in length (round trip), and requires about one hour to complete. The trail passes through a field then follows Falls Brook upstream through a mixed forest and then a climax hardwood forest composed largely of maple, birch, and beech. The deep stream valley narrows dramatically in the vicinity of Uisge Ban Waterfall. At the falls, the sheer walls of the gorge tower 150 metres (500 feet) on either side.

The original trail was developed with assistance from the Nova Scotia Forest Technicians Association. Recent improvements were undertaken by Stora Enso and the Nova Scotia Department of Natural Resources.

Gallery

References

External links
Nova Scotia Geographical Names (listed as Easach Ban - links to a detailed topographical map)
Uisge Ban Falls - Moosebait.com

Waterfalls of Nova Scotia
Tourist attractions in Victoria County, Nova Scotia
Landforms of Victoria County, Nova Scotia